Galium tricornutum is a species of flowering plant in the coffee family known by the common names rough corn bedstraw, roughfruit corn bedstraw, and corn cleavers. It is widespread across most of Europe plus northern Africa and southern Asia, from Norway, Portugal and Morocco to China. It is also naturalized in Australia, the Canary Islands, Mauritius, Madeira, Réunion, Brazil, Argentina, and scattered locales in North America (mostly California and Oregon).

Galium tricornutum is an annual herb with trailing or climbing stems up to about 35 centimeters in length. It forms tangled masses or spreads thin. The stems are sometimes nearly square in cross-section. Leaves are arranged in whorls of 6 to 8 about the stem and are narrow, pointed, and bordered with prickles. Flowers appear in thin clusters of white corollas. The fruits are spherical nutlets hanging in pairs at the leaf axils. This plant is sometimes a weed of grain fields, but it has been driven to the edge of extinction in the UK by drastically changed farming practices over the past 50 years.

References

External links
Jepson Manual Treatment
USDA Plants Profile
Calphotos Photo gallery
Plant Life UK, corn cleavers
Arkive, corn cleavers
Herbario de la Universidad Pública de Navarra
Flore Alpes,  Gaillet à trois cornes
Waste Guía de Plantas, Galio de tres flores, pegajosillo
Cretan Flora, Corn cleavers

tricornutum
Flora of Morocco
Flora of Europe
Flora of Algeria
Flora of Turkey
Flora of the Indian subcontinent
Flora of Iran
Flora of Tibet
Flora of China
Flora of Australia
Flora of the Canary Islands
Flora of Mauritius
Flora of Réunion
Flora of Russia
Flora of Kosovo